Uymen (Üymen) is a rural locality (a selo) and the administrative centre of Uymenskoye Rural Settlement of Choysky District, the Altai Republic, Russia. The population was 387 as of 2016. There are 6 streets.

Geography 

Uymen is located east from Gorno-Altaysk, in the valley of the Uymen River, 71 km southeast of Choya (the district's administrative centre) by road. Karakoksha is the nearest rural locality.

References 

Rural localities in Choysky District